Eldwood Robert Rowley (born September 16, 1941), is an American retired football linebacker. After playing college football for Virginia, he was a member of Pittsburgh Steelers in 1963 and the New York Jets in 1964.

Early life
Rowley was born in Somerset, Pennsylvania, and attended Fort Hill High School. He then attended the University of Virginia where he played for the Cavaliers football team from 1960 to 1962.

Career
Rowley later played professional football in the United Football League (UFL) for the Wheeling Ironmen in 1963, in the NFL for the Pittsburgh Steelers in 1963, and in the AFL for the New York Jets in 1964. He appeared in a total of nine NFL and AFL games.

References

1941 births
Living people
American football linebackers
Pittsburgh Steelers players
New York Jets players
Virginia Cavaliers football players
Players of American football from Pennsylvania
People from Somerset, Pennsylvania